Thomas B. Krajewski (born April 2, 1977) is an American television writer and podcast producer/host. He is known for his work on YooHoo & Friends, Buddy Thunderstruck, Hello Kitty Stump Village and Action Dad and then as Tom “Super Volcano” Krajewski on the "Half Hour Happy Hour" podcast with Alison and Alex.

Early life

In 1987 at the age of 10, Tom decided he wanted to act after seeing Michael J. Fox in Back to the Future. Tom's mother, Ann, suggested the Winchester Cooperative Theatre. Tom memorized the Gettysburg Address in order to audition for Willy Wonka and he won a small role. The following year, he was chosen to play the lead role of Pinocchio, at the same theater. Tom continued to audition for a number of roles including a young John F. Kennedy Jr. for a miniseries on the Kennedy family, and was offered the role.

Career
Following graduation from Winchester High School, 1995, he attended  Emerson College, receiving a [title of degree] in film, in 1999. He moved to Los Angeles, for an internship  on "Talk Soup" and "The Anna Nicole Show." . He got a job at Paramount as a producer's assistant followed by a similar position at Nickelodeon. While at Nickelodeon, he began writing scripts for the Catscratch and The Fairly OddParents.

Tom went on to work on YooHoo & Friends (2012), Action Dad (2012), Buddy Thunderstruck (2017), Space Chickens in Space (2018), and Boy Girl Dog Cat Mouse Cheese (2019).

In June of 2020, the new graphic novel Primer was published by DC Comics and cowritten by Tom and Jennifer Muro.

BID
Since 2015, Tom has been a member of the "Half Hour Happy Hour" podcast, a weekly podcast.

References

1977 births
Living people
American television writers